Martin Dome is an elevated, snow-covered prominence between Argosy Glacier and Argo Glacier in the Miller Range, Antarctica. It was sighted in December 1957 by the New Zealand Southern Party of the Commonwealth Trans-Antarctic Expedition, and was named for L. Martin, leader at Scott Base in 1958.

References

Mountains of Oates Land